Payneham is an eastern suburb of Adelaide in the City of Norwood Payneham St Peters. It is part of a string of suburbs in Adelaide's east with a high proportion of Adelaide's Italian-Australian and French-Australian residents, many of whom can be traced back to the large-scale migration following World War II.

Payneham's northern boundary is Payneham Road with Portrush Road passing south–north through the middle of the suburb.

History
Payneham was named for himself by Samuel Payne (c. 1803–1847), who with his wife Ann, née Maslen, and two children arrived in April 1838 aboard Lord Goderich from London, and occupied section 285, Hundred of Adelaide in 1839.

Payneham Post Office opened on 18 July 1850 and was renamed Marden in 1968.

References

Suburbs of Adelaide
French-Australian culture